Fán (樊) is a Chinese family name. It was the name of a fief, located in present-day Jiyuan in Henan province. Granted by Zhong Shanfu by Zhou Xuang Wang. It is shared by around 2 million people, or 0.150% of the population, with the province with the largest population being Henan.

Notable people
Fan Hui (樊麾), European Go champion
Fan Kuai (樊噲), Han dynasty military general and friend of Han dynasty founder Liu Bang (Emperor Gao)
Fan Rui (樊瑞), historical fictional character from the Water Margin
Louis Fan (convert), Catholic convert and first Chinese witness to modern Europe
Fan Mei-sheng, (樊梅生, born 1942) Hong Kong actor
Louis Fan (actor) (樊少皇), Hong Kong film actor, son of Fan Mei-sheng
Fan Gang (樊刚), economist
Ky Fan (樊𰋀, 1914–2010), Chinese-born American mathematician

References

Individual Chinese surnames